Trevor Wilson may refer to:

Trevor Wilson (footballer) (born 1950), Australian rules footballer 
Trevor Wilson (baseball) (born 1966), American baseball player
Trevor Wilson (basketball) (born 1968), American basketball player
Trevor Wilson (Casualty), fictional security guard in medical drama series

See also
K. Trevor Wilson (born 1981), Canadian comedian